The People's Liberation Army Air Force Airborne Corps is an airborne corps under direct command of the People's Liberation Army Air Force (PLAAF). It was reorganized and renamed from the 15th Airborne Corps in May 2017 and now comprises six airborne brigades and a special operations brigade. The PLAAF Airborne Corps is China's primary strategic airborne unit and part of the newly formed rapid reaction units (RRUs) of the Chinese military which is primarily designated for airborne and special operation missions. Its role is similar to that of the U.S. Army's XVIII Airborne Corps/82nd Airborne Division/101st Airborne Division, British Army's Parachute Regiment and Russian Airborne Forces.

Only one of the PLAAF Airborne Corps' former three divisions (or just 2 to 3 of the current 7 brigades that form the corps) can deploy to any part of China within 48 hours due to limited airlift capabilities. In the late 1990s the airlift capability of the PLAAF consisted of 10 IL-76 heavy lift, Yu-8, and Yu-7 transports, as well as Mi-17, Mi-8, Z-8, and Z-9 helicopters. As such, the PLAAF could only lift one division or two to three brigades of 11,000 men complemented with light tanks, mortars, and self-propelled artillery. In 1988, there were reports claiming that a 10,000 man airborne division was transported to Tibet in less than 48 hours.

History 
The PLAAF Airborne Corps traces its lineage to the 9th Column, created in August 1947, as part of the Shanxi-Hebei-Shandong-Henen Field Army under Liu Bocheng and Deng Xiaoping. The Shanxi-Hebei-Shandong-Henen Field Army was renamed the Central Plains Field Army on May 9, 1948. The 9th Column became the 15th Corps when the Central China Field Army was redesignated as the Second Field Army in February 1949. The unit participated in the Chinese Civil War and afterwards it carried out anti-bandit operations in southern Sichuan before being deployed in Korea in February 1951. As part of the 3rd Army Group, it took part in the Chinese Fifth Phase Offensive in April 1951. The 15th Corps received elite status in recognition of its actions at the Battle of Triangle Hill.

On September 16, 1950, the PLAAF formed its first field unit, the 1st PLAAF Marine Brigade by recruiting six thousand battle hardened soldiers across the 40 Corps of the PLA. The brigade was headquartered in Kaifeng, Henan Province. Thereafter, the unit's designation changed several times, becoming the Air Force Marine 1st Division, the Parachute Division of the Air Force, then the Airborne Division. In May 1961, the Military Commission merged two of the three infantry divisions of the 15th Corps, the 44th and 45th, with the PLAAF's existing airborne division, to create the PLAAF 15th Airborne Corps. All paratrooper units of the Chinese armed forces are under the PLAAF command.

In the 1960s when the commander-in-chief of the PLAAF, General Liu Yalou, was tasked to create an airborne corps, he was given a short list of the most elite units of the PLA, including the 38th and the 15th corps. He chose the 15th Corps for its performance at the Battle of Triangle Hill.

During the restructuring of the PLA in 1985, the 15th Airborne Corps was reduced to three brigades. In the 1990s, the PLA's concept of People's War was replaced by the Limited High-Intensity War concept. This in turn resulted in a return to a corps size structure of three divisions with an overall increase of 25% in the 15th Corps' strength.

As of 1985, most of the soldiers in the 15th Corps were ordinary paratroopers trained for general supporting duties in a combined army campaign. Only 17 percent of them were specialized paratroopers. However, this percentage has now risen to 43 percent and ordinary paratroopers have dropped from 53 percent to 23 percent. The purpose of this increase in the percentage of specialized paratroopers was to make the 15th Airborne Corps into a combined arms force rather than just a mobile infantry force. Thus making it more capable of conducting independent operations in a limited but highly technological focused conflict.

In May 1989, the 15th Airborne Corps’ 43rd and 44th Paratrooper Brigades were deployed to Beijing to enforce martial law and suppress the Tiananmen Square protests of 1989.

The 15th Airborne Corps was renamed the People’s Liberation Army Air Force Airborne Corps in April 2017. It consists of 9 brigades at present, reorganized from its former three divisions and other supporting units.

Current 

According to You Ji's "The Armed forces of China", the PLAAF Airborne Corps has been elevated to the status of a strategic force. It is a departure from the PLA traditional airborne force concept. Doctrinal modernization change allows the PLAAF Airborne Corps to act as a principal force employed for independent campaign missions in future wars. It is now accepted that the airborne troops should be used for pre-emptive attack on the enemy's key military targets in the rear area in order to paralyze or disrupt its preparation for an offensive. This kind of large-scale mission cannot be conducted without having a total control in the air. Also, a single-lift capability of 50,000 men is required for this type of missions. Currently, the PLAAF can only lift one division of 11,000 men with light tanks and self-propelled artillery.

In 2006 Dennis Blasko wrote that the PLAAF Airborne Corps headquarters is in Xiaogan, north of Wuhan in Hubei. The airborne divisions were located as follows: the 43rd Division stationed in Kaifeng, Henan (127th and 128th Airborne Infantry and 129th Airborne Artillery Regiments), and the 44th and 45th Divisions also in the Wuhan area at Guangshui and Huangpi.

More and more focus will be placed on helicopter assaults as opposed to traditional parachute drops. In times of war, the PLAAF Airborne Corps can also utilize strategic airlifters and transport aircraft such as Xi'an Y-20, Shaanxi Y-9, Shaanxi Y-8, Xian Y-7, and very large numbers of Y-5 (700+) utility transports. During a number of exercises, the PLAAF Airborne Corps has demonstrated it can move a regiment plus of paratroopers with light armored vehicles to anywhere within China in less than 24 hours. These exercises also show that a large number of para-gliders are in use.

The PLAAF Airborne Corps' weapons inventory includes 50-100 ZBD-03 derivatives and 2S9 self-propelled mortars, large numbers of BJ212 jeeps with 105mm recoilless rifles or HJ-11 ATGM, and Type 89 120 mm SP anti-tank guns. The last two weapon platforms are air transportable. Additional weapons include Type 84 82mm mortars, Type 85 60mm light mortars, Type 85 107 mm MRL, and more. In 1997, a new lightweight high-mobility vehicle entered service. Reportedly, up to ten of these vehicles can be carried by a Y-7H military transport. Paratroopers are outfitted with portable GPS systems, night-vision goggles, radios and other high-tech equipment.
In recent years, we've seen more and more mainstream as well as specialized equipment designed with air-dropped deployment in mind. This affords the troops with greater mobility, versatility and protection so that they may quickly adapt to the battlefield environment with new tactics, multidimensional engagement capability while increasing their situation awareness. Previously, airborne troopers all carry more or less the same standard issued equipment during deployment. After the most recent restructuring efforts, they are now trained to carry a vast number of varying weapons and field equipment during deployment, they may now customize their load-out specific to their responsibility in the integral unit so that when they arrived at their designated position they will have everything at their disposal to meet all sorts of battlefield requirements to gain a tactical advantage. There will also be more heavier armored units making use of recently inducted Type-15 light tanks, PCL-181 wheeled vehicle-mounted 155mm howitzers and new generation airborne armored vehicles in future deployments to increase the mechanization and informatization of future era operations.

The Airborne Divisions have various special units, including weapons controllers, reconnaissance, infantry, artillery, communications, engineering, chemical defense, and transportation soldiers. Today, the Airborne Brigades which are further divided into battalions and companies or batteries.

International Army Games
In 2015, Chinese paratroopers took first place in the International Army Games which took place in Russia.

In 2016, Chinese paratroopers came in third place in the International Army Games which took place in Russia.

In 2017, a Chinese paratrooper team placed first in the Airborne Platoon contest at the International Army Games-2017. The Chinese airborne troops won first place in 11 out of 12 events. Russia was second and Kazakhstan, third, the media were told at the contest’s press-center. The Chinese team scored 62 points while the Russian team scored 50 points. The Kazakhstan team scored 42 points.

In 2018 a Chinese paratrooper team placed second in the Airborne Platoon contest at the 2018 International Army Games

Equipment 
The People's Liberation Army Air Force Airborne Corps operates mechanized infantry formations with light tanks, infantry fighting vehicles, anti-tank missile carriers, and light training aircraft.

See also 

 
 People's Liberation Army Navy Marine Corps
 People's Liberation Army special operations forces
 Russian Airborne Forces
 1st Airborne Brigade (Japan)

References

Citations

Sources 

 http://english.chinamil.com.cn/news-channels/china-military-news/2015-08/06/content_6617856.htm
 Summary of 15th Airborne Corps at GlobalSecurity.org
 
 
 
 http://eng.armygames2016.mil.ru/page190811.html
 

Air force units and formations of the Chinese People's Liberation Army
Corps of the People's Liberation Army
Airborne units and formations
Military units and formations established in 1961
1961 establishments in China